Ernst Gebhard Salomon Anschütz (28 October 1780 in Goldlauter near Suhl, Electorate of Saxony – 18 December 1861 (other sources: 11 December 1861) in Leipzig) was a German teacher, organist, poet, and composer. Anschütz worked as a teacher in Leipzig for 50 years.

Works
""; 1837; Text: 
Based on "" (c.  1770)
"" (text, 1824)
"" (text, 1824), based on a 16th-century Silesian folk song by Melchior Franck

References

External links
 
 
 

1780 births
1861 deaths
People from Suhl
People from the Electorate of Saxony
German male composers
German composers
German classical organists
German male organists
German poets
19th-century German educators
Writers from Thuringia
German male poets
19th-century German musicians
19th-century German male musicians
Male classical organists
19th-century organists